The Ubykh (Ubykh: Пэху / Туахы, Pəxu / Tuaxy; , Ubyx;) are one of the twelve Circassian tribes, representing one of the twelve stars on the green-and-gold Circassian flag. Along with the Natukhai and Shapsug tribes, the Ubykh were one of three coastal Circassian tribes to form the Circassian Assembly (Adyghe: Адыгэ Хасэ) in 1860. Historically, they spoke a distinct Ubykh language, which never existed in written form and went extinct in 1992 when Tevfik Esenç, the last speaker, died.

History

The Ubykh used to inhabit the capital of Circassia, Sache (Circassian: Шъачэ, lit. seaside) — present-day Sochi, Krasnodar Krai, Russia. The province of the Ubykh tribe was situated between the Shapsug tribe near Tuapse and the Sadz (Dzhigets) in the north of Gagra. The Ubykh tribe were mentioned in book IV of Procopius' De Bello Gothico (The Gothic War), under the name βροῦχοι (Bruchi), a corruption of the native term tʷaχ. In the 1667 book of Evliya Çelebi, the Ubykh were mentioned as Ubúr without any other information.

The Ubykh were semi-nomadic horsemen, and had a finely-differentiated vocabulary related to horses and tack. Some Ubykh also practiced favomancy and scapulimancy. However, the Ubykh gained more prominence in modern times. By 1864, during the reign of Tsar Alexander II, the Russian conquest of the Northwestern Caucasus had  been completed. The other Circassian tribes and the Abkhaz were decimated, and the Abaza were partially driven out of the Caucasus.

Faced with the threat of subjugation by the Russian army, the Ubykh, as well as other Muslim peoples of Caucasus, left their homeland en masse beginning on 6 March 1864. By May 21, the entire Ubykh nation had departed from the Caucasus. They eventually settled in a number of villages in western Turkey around the municipality of Manyas.

In order to avoid discrimination, the Ubykh elders encouraged their people to assimilate into Turkish culture. Having abandoned their traditional nomadic culture, they became a nation of farmers. The Ubykh language was rapidly displaced by Turkish and other Circassian dialects; the last native speaker of Ubykh, Tevfik Esenç, died in 1992.

Today, the Ubykh diaspora has been scattered about Turkey and—to a much lesser extent—Jordan. The Ubykh nation per se no longer exists, although those who are of Ubykh ancestry are proud to call themselves Ubykh, and a couple of villages are still found in Turkey where the vast majority of the population is Ubykh by descent.

Ubykh society was patrilineal; many Ubykh descendants today know five, six, or even seven generations of their agnatic ancestry. Nevertheless, as in other Northwest Caucasian tribes, women were especially venerated, and the Ubykh retained a special second person pronoun prefix used exclusively with women (-).

Notable people
 Keriman Halis Ece of Пщызэмыгъу family – winner of Miss Turkey 1932 and Miss Universe 1932 beauty pageants
 Perestü Valide Sultan of Гогэн family – Valide Sultan (Empress mother) of Abdulhamid II of the Ottoman Empire
 Şevkefza Valide Sultan of Заурмыкъу family – Valide Sultan (Empress mother) of Murad V of the Ottoman Empire
 Düzdidil Kadın - consort of Sultan Abdulmejid I of the Ottoman empire.
 Setenay Özbek - artist
 Tevfik Esenç - politician, last known speaker of the Ubykh language (1904-1992)

See also
 Ubykhia, a region in Circassia
 Other Circassian tribes:
 Abzakh
 Besleney
 Bzhedug
 Hatuqwai
 Kabardians
 Mamkhegh
 Natukhai
 Shapsug
 Temirgoy
 Yegeruqwai
 Zhaney

References

External links

Journal of a residence in Circassia during the years 1837, 1838, and 1839 - Bell, James Stanislaus (English)
 Bagrat Shinkuba. The Last of the Departed on Circassian Library

 
Circassians
Circassian tribes
Ethnic groups in Russia
Ethnic groups in Turkey
Adygea